The Buxton Hitmen were a speedway team in the British National League (formerly the Conference League) from 1994 to 2018. The club stopped racing in the National League after the 2018 speedway season.

History
The team's inaugural season was in the 1994 British League Division Three in which they finished in 6th place. They following year they finished 3rd in the 1995 Academy League before joining the Conference League (division 3). 

During the 2002 Speedway Conference League season the team won their first silverware when winning the Conference League Knockout Cup.

In the 25 years that the team raced they always competed in the third division and their best season was 2010 when they achieved the treble. After finishing 2nd in the regular season table behind Dudley Heathens during the 2010 National League speedway season they won the playoffs, defeating Newport in the final. They also won the Knockout Cup and National Trophy.

Honours
Conference Knockout Cup 2002
National League Champions 2010
National League Knockout Cup 2010
National Trophy 2010

Season summary

Riders previous seasons

2007 team

2008 team

Also rode:

2009 team

Also Rode:

2010 team

2018 team

 Ben Wilson
 James Cockle
 Connor Coles
 Tom Woolley
 Lewis Whitmore
 Corban Pavitt
 Kieran Douglas

References

Hitmen
Speedway Conference League teams
Sport in Derbyshire
National League speedway teams
1994 establishments in England
2018 disestablishments in England
Sports clubs established in 1994
Sports clubs disestablished in 2018